Take a Bow is a British children's television series that was shown regularly on the CBeebies channel in the United Kingdom. The series features children performing in at a landmark in their area. The performances are shot in the style of a pop video. The performances vary from a singer on the London Eye, to organ playing in Blackpool Tower, from break dancing to playing in a jazz band.

There are twenty five programme in the first series, and there was a second series too. Take a Bow originally began airing on 19 February 2007.

Locations
 London Eye
 National Railway Museum
 Blackpool Tower
 Alton Towers

Episodes

External links
 

BBC children's television shows
2007 British television series debuts
2007 British television series endings
2000s British children's television series
2000s preschool education television series
British preschool education television series
CBeebies
English-language television shows
Television series about children